The Diocese of Stavanger is a diocese in the Church of Norway. It covers all of Rogaland county in western Norway. The cathedral city is Stavanger, where the Stavanger Cathedral is located.  The bishop is Anne Lise Ådnøy, who has held the post since 2019.

History
The Diocese of Stavanger was established in the 12th century (either 1112 or maybe 1125) when it was separated from the Ancient Diocese of Bergen. Initially, the large diocese covered the (modern) counties of Rogaland, Aust-Agder, and Vest-Agder as well as the regions of Valdres (in Oppland county), Hallingdal (in Buskerud county), and the parishes of Eidfjord and Røldal (in Hordaland county).  After the Protestant Reformation, the Diocese of Stavanger continued in the new Church of Norway.

Over time, the diocese was reduced in size.  The parish of Eidfjord was transferred to the neighboring Diocese of Bjørgvin in 1630. The regions of Valdres and Hallingdal were transferred to the Diocese of Oslo in 1631, but in exchange, the Diocese of Oslo had to give the upper part of Telemark and transfer that to the Diocese of Stavanger.

In 1682 Christian V, King of Denmark-Norway issued an order that the Bishop and the Prefect of the Diocese of Stavanger were to be moved to the Christianssand Cathedral, which had been consecrated in 1646 and which the King intended to be the perfect site for a new cathedral. The citizens of Stavanger protested, with the Prefect and the Bishop refusing to move and ignoring the order. It took two years before Christianssand was established as the new cathedral city. The diocese was renamed Diocese of Christianssand.

On 1 January 1925, the Diocese of Kristiansand was divided and all of the diocese located in Rogaland county was moved to the newly re-established Diocese of Stavanger and the cathedral in Stavanger regained its place as the seat of a bishop.

Bishops of Stavanger

Catholic (12th century-Reformation)

 Reinald ca. 1112–1135
 Jon Birgersson, 1135–1152
 Peter, 1152–??
 Amund, ??–1171
 Eirik Ivarsson, 1171–1188
 Njål, 1189/90–1207
 Henrik, 1207–1224
 Askell Jonsson, 1226–1254
 Torgils, 1255–1276

 Arne, 1277–1303
 Ketil, 1304–1317
 Håkon Halldorsson, 1318–1322
 Eirik Ogmundsson, 1322–1342
 Guttorm Pålsson, 1343–1350
 Sigfrid, 1351–1352
 Gyrd Aslason, 1354–1355
 Bottolf Asbjørnsson, 1355–1380
 Hallgeirr Osmundsson, 1380/81

 Olaf, 1381/82–1398/1400
 Håkon Ivarsson, 1400–1426
 Audun Eyvindsson, 1427–1445
 Gunnar Eriksson, 1445–1451/53
 Sigurd Bjørnsson, 1454–1463
 Alv Thorgardsson, 1464–1478
 Eiliv Jonsson, 1481–1512
 Hoskuld Hoskuldsson, 1513–1537

Lutheran (Reformation–1682)

 Jon Guttormsen, 1541–1557
 Jens Gregersen Riber, 1558–1571
 Jørgen Eriksen, 1571–1604
 Laurits Clausen Scabo, 1605–1626

 Tomas Cortsen Wegner, 1627–1654
 Markus Christensen Humble, 1655–1661
 Christen Madsen Tausan, 1661–1680
In 1682 the diocese seat was moved from Stavanger to Christianssand

Lutheran (1925–present)

The large Diocese of Kristiansand was divided with all of Rogaland county becoming the newly re-established Diocese of Stavanger
 Jacob Christian Petersen, 1925–1940
 Gabriel Skagestad, 1940–1949
 Karl Martinussen, 1949–1960
 Fritjov Søiland Birkeli, 1960–1968
 Olav Hagesæther, 1968–1976

 Sigurd Lunde, 1977–1986
 Bjørn Bue, 1986–1997
 Ernst Oddvar Baasland, 1998–2009
 Erling Johan Pettersen, 2009–2016
 Ivar Braut, 2017-2019
 Anne Lise Ådnøy since 2019

Structure
The Diocese of Stavanger is divided into nine deaneries spread out over Rogaland county.  Each deanery corresponds a geographical area, usually one or more municipalities in the diocese.  Each municipality is further divided into one or more parishes which each contain one or more congregations.  See each municipality below for lists of churches and parishes within them.

References

Stavanger
Rogaland
Organisations based in Stavanger